was a Japanese mathematician who was awarded the Lester R. Ford Award in 1976 for his work in number theory, specifically on his work in the Diophantine representation of prime numbers.  His doctoral supervisor at the University of California, Los Angeles was Ernst G. Straus.

Biography 
Sato was an only child born in Fujinomiya, Shizuoka, Japan on June 1, 1932. While still attending high school, Sato published his first mathematics research paper, which led to his acceptance at the Tokyo University of Education.  There, Sato earned a B.S. in theoretical physics, a popular academic field at the time due to the recent Nobel Prize in Physics awarded in 1949 to Hideki Yukawa. Later, in 1965, Shin'ichirō Tomonaga, one of Dr. Sato's professors at this university, was also awarded a Nobel Prize in Physics.

Following his undergraduate degree in Japan, he switched his studies to mathematics, earning a M.Sc. and a Ph.D from UCLA, and eventually became tenured at the University of Saskatchewan, Regina campus in Regina, Saskatchewan, Canada.  Following his retirement in 1997 he was granted the position Professor Emeritus at the University of Regina which is what the Regina campus became in 1974. Subsequently, he further taught at the Tokyo University of Social Welfare from 2000 until 2006, after which he returned to Canada.  He died at Ladner, British Columbia on May 28, 2008.

Sato's interests included integer valued entire functions, generalized interpolation by analytic functions, prime representing functions, and function theory.  It is in the field of prime representing functions that Sato co-authored a paper with James P. Jones, Hideo Wada, and Douglas Wiens entitled "Diophantine Representation of the Set of Prime Numbers", which won them the Lester R. Ford Award in Mathematics in 1976.

Publications 

 —Dissertation: Ph. D. 

 — MathSciNet review: 0409325

References 

1932 births
2008 deaths
20th-century Japanese mathematicians
21st-century Japanese mathematicians
Number theorists
People from Fujinomiya, Shizuoka
University of California, Los Angeles alumni